William Gallacher (29 June 1919 – 16 October 1982) was a Scottish professional footballer who played as an inside forward.

Career
Born in Renfrew, Gallacher's career as a footballer was fairly short due to the interruption of World War II, in which he served in the Royal Engineers. He  played for St Anthony's (Junior grade), Celtic, Falkirk, Ayr United, St Johnstone and Inverness Thistle.

His brother was fellow footballer Tommy Gallacher. They were the sons of Patsy Gallacher, one of Celtic's legendary players who also spent time at Falkirk. Tommy's son Brian also became a footballer, as did another nephew, Kevin, who played for Scotland at World Cup 98.

The Gallachers are also related to another footballing branch of the family, John Divers and his son of the same name who both played for Celtic.

References

External links
 William Gallacher profile at thecelticwiki.com

1919 births
1982 deaths
Scottish footballers
St Anthony's F.C. players
Scottish Junior Football Association players
Celtic F.C. players
Falkirk F.C. players
Ayr United F.C. players
St Johnstone F.C. players
Inverness Thistle F.C. players
Highland Football League players
Scottish Football League players
Association football inside forwards
British Army personnel of World War II
Royal Engineers soldiers
Willie
People from Renfrew
Footballers from Renfrewshire
Military personnel from Renfrewshire